

Territorial Supreme Court 
 George Turner (1861–1864)
 Horatio M. Jones (1861–1864)
 Gordon N. Mott (1861–1864)
 Powhatan B. Locke (1864–1864)
 John W. North (1864–1864)

Statehood 
Following is a list of the Supreme Court of Nevada justices.

Chief justices 
The Chief Justice rotates on the Supreme Court of Nevada, almost always to a judge who is in their final two years of their term. Following the expansions of the court in 1967 and 1999, judges began to split what had traditionally been a two-year term between two or three justices, allowing each justice the opportunity to be Chief Justice during their six-year term. For many chief justices, the date of dates of tenure are drawn from the dates of court terms in the Nevada Judicial History Database.

Notes

Sources 
 Political History of Nevada. Chapter 6: The Nevada Judiciary
 Nevada Judicial Historical Society Memorials and Investitures

External links

 
Nevada
Justices